Mario Centeno (born 17 October 1961) is a Nicaraguan boxer. He competed in the men's light middleweight event at the 1984 Summer Olympics.

References

1961 births
Living people
Nicaraguan male boxers
Olympic boxers of Nicaragua
Boxers at the 1984 Summer Olympics
Place of birth missing (living people)
Light-middleweight boxers